Astondo is located in the north of Spain, in the Basque Country, Bizkaia, Gorliz. In the same sea, with Plentzia and Gorliz forms one of the biggest beaches of the cost of  Bizkaia, concretely has a length of 4 km and 200 metres of cliffs. The main neighborhoods near Astondo are: Areatza, Andra Mari, Gandia and  Urezarantza.

In this small area there is a variety of natural surroundings, and in the east part are situated Ermua (288m.), Urzuri (270m.) and Aizkorri (148m.) mountains. In the south part is located the Martiartu ( 123m.) and Junkera (84m.) mountains. Near Astondo it is also located the Billano isle.

History 
Because of its geography, the people that lived in Astondo and surroundings used to work in the seamanship. There are many advantages that the fields and lands of this village allowed for having ranching and stock breeding. The extraction of the wood was also popular in these lands giving the working class the opportunity to earn money. Many trees on the hills were chopped down for ship-building. In 1740, it was considered one of the most important pieces of the fleet merchant of all Biscay according to the traffic of the iron mineral. Goliz and Astondo had 15 vessels with the cavity of 5280 hundredweight, this is 264 tonnes.

When the Bay of Biscay notified the presence of the English war-naves in 1741, they decided to protect this coast for preventing possible attacks. This land had the support of its bunkers which were built in XVIII, and they used to work until the middle of the XIX. Nowadays, they are located between the Areatza borough and Azkorriaga, where today they are still some remains.

Because of the period of the industrialisation, the hospital of Gorliz was built as residences for the summer. Here we can see the start of the summer break of this place.

Place to visit 
Astondo has many interesting environments, and because of its gentle climate, makes it one of the most visited places in the Uribe kosta. Walking down to the beach, we can see the hospital of Gorliz which at first it was built for the Heliotherapy Sanatorium Marine, founded in 1919. At that time, it was so important for the therapy of tuberculosis of children. This building was the first of the Iberian Peninsula erected with reinforced concrete.

Festivities 
San pedro. 29 June Iberre borough

Santiago. 25 July

Andra Mari. 5 August

Urezarantza-Fao. 3 August

Transport 
It is accessible from the BI-2120 road to Mungia, taking the exit from the Saratxaga roundabout to Gorliz and then taking the BI-3158 (Uresarantze Bidea), that goes to Gorliz Hospital. There are also several bus lines close directly to the beach and from the last stop on line 1 of the underground Metro Bilbao, "Plentzia", it is a pleasant walk of around 2 km along the edge of the River Butroe estuary to Gorliz beach.

External links 
 http://www.gorliz.eu/eu-ES/Turismoa/Leku-Interesgarriak/Orrialdeak/lugares_02ElPinar.aspx 
 http://www.eitb.eus/es/eltiempo/playas/436455/gorliz-astondo/
 http://www.gorliz.eu/en-US/Tourism/Places-Of-Interest/Pages/default.aspx
 http://www.bizkaia.net/Ingurugiroa_Lurraldea/Hondartzak/detallePlaya.asp?nPlaya=11&Tem_Codigo=350&Idioma=IN&banoAsistidoPulsado=
 http://um.gipuzkoakultura.net/itsasmemoria6/369-380_cavamesa.pdf
 http://www.gorliz.eu/en-US/Tourism/Festivals/Pages/default.aspx

Populated places in Biscay